Cristian Nemescu (31 March 1979 – 24 August 2006) was a Romanian film director.

Nemescu was born in Bucharest. He graduated from the Academy for Theater and Film in 2003. During his final year in the academy he made a short film, Story From The Third Block Entrance, that received awards at the NYU International Student Film Festival and the Premiers Plans in Angers, France. The European Academy Awards nominated it as "best short film" that year.

Nemescu's Marilena from P7, which he wrote and directed, entered in the 2006 Cannes competition.

Nemescu's last film was California Dreamin' (Endless), starring Armand Assante. He finished filming in July and was in post-production at the time of his death. The movie was awarded the Un Certain Regard prize at the 2007 Cannes Film Festival.

Nemescu was killed in a car crash in Bucharest that also killed Romanian-born sound engineer Andrei Toncu. Nemescu and Toncu were riding in a taxi that was struck on Eroilor Bridge by a Porsche Cayenne SUV driven by a British citizen (Ali Imran) who ran a red light. Technical expertise established that the Porsche was going 113 km/h (63 km/h above the speed limit), while the taxi had a speed of 42 km/h. The driver was initially sentenced to 7 years in prison by a Romanian court but this was later reduced to 6 years.

Filmography as director
 2007 California Dreamin' (unfinished)
 2006 Marilena de la P7 (Marilena from P7)
 2003 Poveste la scara C (C Block Story)
 2001 Mihai şi Cristina (Mihai and Cristina)
 2001 Mecano
 2000 La bloc oamenii mor după muzică (In Apartment Buildings People Are Crazy About Music)
 2000 Kitchitoarele

References

External links
Ologeanu, Cristina. (2006, August 26). Two Gifted Film Makers and Their Taxi Driver Die in Car Crash. Jurnalul

1979 births
2006 deaths
Film people from Bucharest
Road incident deaths in Romania
Romanian film directors
Caragiale National University of Theatre and Film alumni